Anolis boulengerianus, also known commonly as the Tehuantepec anole, is a species of lizard in the family Dactyloidae. The species is endemic to the Mexican state of Oaxaca.

Etymology
The specific name, boulengerianus, is in honor of Belgian-born British herpetologist George Albert Boulenger.

Geographic range
A. boulengerianus is found in southeastern Oaxaca.

Habitat
The preferred natural habitat of A. boulengerianus is forest.

Description
Females are about 10% smaller.

Reproduction
A. boulengerianus is oviparous.

References

Further reading
Köhler G, Trejo Pérez RG, Peterson CBP, Méndez de la Cruz FR (2014). "A revision of the Mexican Anolis (Reptilia, Squamata, Dactyloidae) from the Pacific versant west of the Isthmus de Tehuantepec in the states of Oaxaca, Guerrero, and Puebla, with the description of six new species". Zootaxa 3862 (1): 1–210. (Anolis boulengerianus, p. 103).
Mata-Silva V, Johnson JD, Wilson LD, García-Padilla E (2015). "The herpetofauna of Oaxaca, Mexico: composition, physiographic distribution, and conservation status". Mesoamerican Herpetology 2 (1): 6–62.
Thominot A (1887). "Description de trois espèces nouvelles d' Anolis et d'un amphisbænian ". Bulletin de la Societé Philomatique de Paris, Septième Série [= Seventh Series] 11: 182–190. (Anolis boulengerianus, new species, pp. 182–183). (in French).

Anoles
Endemic reptiles of Mexico
Reptiles described in 1887
Taxa named by Alexandre Thominot